Carnegie Mellon University in Australia is the Australian campus of Carnegie Mellon University's H. John Heinz III College established in 2006 in the city centre of Adelaide, South Australia.

The move by Heinz to establish a campus in Australia was announced in Pittsburgh in 2005 by South Australian Premier Mike Rann, following negotiations with Carnegie Mellon President Jared Cohon.

Facilities and courses
The campus has students, faculty and staff from more than 29 countries throughout the Asia-Pacific, United States, Europe, Latin America, Africa and the Middle East. The university offers two master's degree programs: the Master of Science in Public Policy and Management and the Master of Science in Information Technology and Management. Both programs are available as a 12-month or 21-month program, depending on the student's work experience, and can be undertaken full-time or part-time. Carnegie Mellon University Australia also offers students the opportunity to undertake Global Programs, whereby they undertake their studies at both the campus in Pittsburgh and Adelaide.

Other programs offered include an executive education program for executives and professionals and specialisations in business intelligence and data analytics and digital transformation.

In August 2011, the Software Engineering Institute (SEI) launched their Asia-Pacific operations at Carnegie Mellon University – Australia's campus in Adelaide. Through this location, the SEI will offer their advanced courses and certifications to the Australian market, and collaborate with local companies and organisations on software development and cyber security.

Carnegie Mellon University is the first American university to open a campus in Australia. The university chose to open a campus in Adelaide as part of the South Australian Government's vision to establish Australia's first international university precinct around Victoria Square in the Adelaide city centre. The university is guided by a Joint Advisory Board of influential leaders from around Australia and the Asia-Pacific region. The precinct is situated in the heart of the city; Carnegie Mellon University – Australia is co-located with the University College London's School of Energy and Resources (Australia), research and policy institutes including the Torrens Resilience Institute and The Australian Centre for Social Innovation, and adjacent to the Flinders University's city facilities.

See also

List of universities in Australia

References 

Schools and departments of Carnegie Mellon
Education in Adelaide
Educational institutions established in 2006
2006 establishments in Australia
Universities in South Australia
Campuses in South Australia